Cycling in Sydney, New South Wales, Australia takes place for recreation, commuting and as a sport. Sydney has a hilly topography and so may require a slightly higher level of fitness from cyclists than flatter cities such as Melbourne and Canberra. Sydney depends heavily on motor vehicles where traffic and public transport operate at capacity. This means that cyclist are often competing with motorists for limited space on busier roads, and for limited government resources for expenditure on road infrastructure.  In its favour, Sydney has a generally mild climate and there are active cycling groups.

In 2015 the NSW Government enacted legislation that increased fines for many offences that are considered by some as trivial or even legal in most other countries, such as riding without a helmet.

Cycling in Australia has, until recently, been a minority interest sport, and hostility on the road is also common. One Danish cyclist, Thomas Andersen, who had cycled around the world for four years, more than 30,000 kilometres through 25 countries from Europe to Asia to Australia to South America, singled out Sydney in 2014 as being the worst city he had visited for cyclists.

Sydney cycling network

For the most part, cyclists ride on the road with motor vehicles (current regulations only  permit cyclists under 16 years old to ride on the footpath. Historically, bicycle infrastructure was largely constructed in areas for recreational riding or along shared paths such as in parks. Prior to the involvement of Jan Gehl, the City of Sydney created a Bicycle Action Plan in 2007, part of which involved building physically separated cycleways. In May 2009, the first of these, a 200m stretch along King Street in the CBD opened. In the following decade the number of commuter cycling trips doubled and the City of Sydney produced a Cycling Strategy and Action Plan 2018 - 2030. The plan sets out to prioritise connecting the cycleway network, supporting people to ride, supporting business to support their employees to ride and to lead by example.

Subsequently, longer segregated paths have been built along selected routes through the city. There had been plans to extend these separated routes, however these have largely not gone ahead, and some important  commuter paths, like the College Street bike path, have actually been removed in 2015 at the insistence of Duncan Gay, the former Minister for Roads, Maritime and Freight (who has openly described himself as "the biggest bike lane sceptic in government") with the support of Mike Baird, a former Premier of New South Wales.

Another criticism of Sydney's separated paths is that the traffic lights preference cars over both pedestrians and cyclists.  Not only are cyclists critical of the reported difficulty in triggering a light change, they are also unhappy that priority is afforded to cars by default, in much the same way that pedestrians must push a button before being included in the traffic light sequence.

Coinciding with the City of Sydney's new investment in cycleways, the state of NSW has repeatedly released statewide plans for bicycle infrastructure, including in 2010, BikePlan NSW. The plan is acknowledged by Bicycle NSW, but thought to be underfunded by local bicycle groups. While premier of NSW, Kristina Keneally bicycle commuted 10 km each way from the suburb of Pagewood to the CBD. The latest plan, Sydney's Cycling Future was published in December 2013.

Participation

The National Walking and Cycling Participation Survey for 2021 found the following participation rates for cycling in Sydney 

 Within the last week : 14.9%
 Within the last month: 23.6%
 Within the last year : 35.7%

Planning and government

Local government
One of the aims of BikePlan 2007–2017 is increasing total percentage trips in the city from 2% to 5% by 2011.

Aside from building cycleways, City of Sydney has engaged in a publicity campaign, 
subsidised cycling courses, installed parking rings throughout the city and subsidised bicycle parking at City of Sydney events which also fund BIKESydney (the local BUG). New development controls have been suggested which, among other things, require increasing bicycle facilities in residential and commercial properties. The City of Sydney's '2030 Sustainable Sydney' plan (2008) has a section dedicated to cycling.

Cooperation with other associations is often required. For example, the two bridges leading into the CBD are controlled by the Sydney Harbour Foreshore Authority (Pyrmont Bridge), and the RMS (Sydney Harbour Bridge). The NSW government, through the RMS, control all traffic lights (including along cycleways), arterial roads and speed limits. Although there are plans to limit major CBD roads to private cars, on-going efforts to make the city more friendly to non-motorised transport are made through agreements with the NSW state government.

Other city councils also have bicycle plans of varying scope, based on funding, local demand, and current facilities. In July 2010, Parramatta City Council installed secure bicycle storage area in their city areas, while proposing to reduce overall funding for cycling facilities.

Many councils maintain detailed information about cycling in their region. Some examples are: 
 City of Sydney 
 Lane Cove Council
 North Sydney Council
 Willoughby Council

State government
Transport for NSW is the state responsible for road infrastructure and safety. Their latest bike plan was produced in December 2013.

Regulations

It is not uncommon for bicycles to be allowed thoroughfare where cars are not. These may be labelled "bicycles excepted", "shared zones" etc. Contraflow lanes have been installed on some one-way streets specifically for bicycles. The NSW Roads Regulations states that a person must not ride a bicycle on any part of the Sydney Harbour Bridge other than a cycleway.

Groups
Bicycle NSW is a member-based association representing bicycle users across New South Wales since 1976 and boasts a membership of 15,000+ members, supporters and subscribers. Launched as the Bicycle Institute of NSW to advocate for the use of bicycles for transport, they continue to advocate for the essential infrastructure and education to improve rider safety, and host a series of events to increase participation and rider experiences. Membership of Bicycle NSW includes personal accident and third party liability insurance when riding and a range of other benefits.

Bike Sydney is a not-for-profit community Bicycle User Group (BUG) organisation established in 2000 to lobby state and local government and has since expanded beyond advocacy and is involved in cycling events and services around Sydney.

Bicycle Network, originally Bicycle Victoria, is one of the largest cycling membership organisations in the world, with 45,000 members in 2015.

BUGs
Many local Bicycle User Groups (BUGs) operate to assist and advocate for cyclists through an official Affiliation or friendly association with Bicycle NSW. Bicycle NSW  maintains a list of BUGs across NSW. A rides calendar is also available.

Cooperatives
Sydney has several community based bicycle cooperatives or organisations. Their activities include repair workshops, bike recycling, training and education.
 The Nunnery Community Bike Workshop is in Redfern and helps  working bikes go back into the community.
 Bicycle Garden in Alexandria runs weekly workshops and collects bikes for asylum seekers in Sydney 
 Newtown Bike Shed runs weekly workshops and collects bikes for asylum seekers in Sydney
 Bikes 4 Life  alleviates poverty and social injustice in Australia and overseas by recycling and restoring discarded bikes. Currently operating from Kimbriki Resource Recovery Centre in Terry Hills.

University bike clubs and cycling information
 Sydney University provides information to cyclists on their website
 Students at the University of New South Wales have established the UNSW Bike Club. UNSW Bike Club was awarded Arc small club of the year in 2009.
 The University of Technology Sydney (UTS) provides information to cyclists online.

Other groups
 Bike Bus, a Sydney commuters group.
 Dulwich Hill Bicycle Club, a club for inner west Sydney cyclists.
 Neo Cycling Club, an Inner Western Sydney Cycling Club providing cycling events and group rides for both adults and juniors.

As interest in cycling grows, increasing numbers of informal interest groups have emerged, such as Sydney Cycle Chic, and Sydney Bicycle Film Festival. Others exist as Facebook groups including I Love Sydney Bike Lanes and Cycleways.

Maps and routes

Many councils provide cycling maps in paper and downloadable format. The NSW government provides a similar service

Several collaborative mapping services are available, some using Google Maps for their base layer
 Cycleway Finder (NSW Government)
 Open Cycle Map
 Bike Yak Sydney Trails
BikeTrail.Blog Sydney Map

Bike riding experiences are published in these magazines.

 Bicycling Australia Magazine

Rides

Regular
 The Bicycle NSW events page regularly links upcoming rides from various BUGs.

Annual
 'Ride to Work Day' is held in October in all capital cites.
 Bobbin Head Cycle Classic 
 'Tweed Ride', was in ride in tweed clothing.
 'Sydney to the Hunter' is a 3-day ride from Sydney to the Hunter Valley, held in early September.
 'Sydney Spring Cycle' rides various routes aimed at families, held in October.
 'The Gong Ride' is a 90 km ride from Sydney to Wollongong, held in early November, raising money for MS Australia. In 2011 more than $4 million was raised.
 Ride of Silence The last time Sydney participated in this was 2008. There was no ride in Sydney in 2010.

Internet

Several groups have active discussion boards and web sites.

Public transport
Due to Sydney's geography, trains and ferries complement cyclists well. For example, trains can take you to the start of some great cycling rides in Ku Ring Gai Chase National Park, or a ferry across Sydney harbour can shorten a cycling trip by not having to rely on limited bridge crossings.   Ferry wharves are also frequently beyond walking distance from surrounding facilities.

Travelling with a bicycle

Bicycles are permitted free of charge on Sydney Trains, Sydney Metro and Sydney Ferries.  Ferry access is subject to availability of space. They are not permitted on Sydney Buses.

Bicycle Storage
There's a growing number of bike sheds and lockers at train stations, ferry wharves and bus interchanges.

Trains
Sydney Trains railway stations have an uneven amount of bicycle parking

Those transporting a bicycle on a train will notice that not all stations have ramps or lifts to get to the train platform.

Most city trains do not have specific provision for bicycles, aside from the vestibule area. Intercity trains operating Newcastle, the Blue Mountains and the South Coast frequently have a single hook at the end of the carriage.

Ferries
Private operators may allow bicycles on board, sometimes for a fee, but it is worth checking before travelling. Private ferry services include: 
 My Fast Ferry
 Cronulla to Bundeena (surcharge applies for bicycles)
 Palm Beach to Central Coast

Light rail
Bicycles are allowed on all Light Rail services subject to availability of space. They were also permitted aboard the former Sydney Monorail.

Services
Sydney has many cycling focused businesses offering services such as courses to build confidence and learn how to ride safely on road, bicycle fitting, frame and custom building, bicycle hire and guided tours.

Facilities

Parking stations
The City of Sydney council offers free parking for bicycles at Goulburn Street and Kings Cross car parks There are also a number of bike sheds and lockers in the city including opal card operated security parking such as at Redfern and Green Square train stations.

Velodromes
Sydney has several velodromes including the indoor Dunc Gray Velodrome  (Bankstown), which was part of the Sydney 2000 Olympic Games. Outdoor tracks are located Hurstville Oval, Lidcombe Oval,  Merrylands Oval and Tempe.  Many velodromes have been demolished including sites at Wiley Park, Camperdown and Surry Hills.

Criterium Track
 Heffron Park (Maroubra) 2.04 km,
 Randwick Botany Cycling Club

Events
 'Super Tuesday'. Sydney participates in this annual count of cyclists on the road held in March, organised by Bicycle Network.

Annual awards
 The 'City of Sydney Business Awards' nominations are sought in June, with winners announced in September. A new category for "Bicycle Business" of the year was created for 2010.

See also

 Bike paths in Sydney
 Cycling in New South Wales
 Cycling in Australia

References

External links
 NSW Bike Plan – Bicycle Information for New South Wales

 
Cycling in New South Wales (Australia)
Sydney